The following is an episode list of the ITV television series Strange but True?. In all, there have been 39 episodes.

Episodes

Pilot (1993)

Series 1 (1994)

Series 2 (1995)

Series 3 (1996)

Special (1997)

Series 4 (1997)

External links
 

Lists of British non-fiction television series episodes